Yorgan Edem Agblemagnon (born 9 July 1999) is a footballer who plays as a goalkeeper for French club US Châteauneuf-sur-Loire. Born in France, he made two appearances for the Togo national team in 2017.

International career
Agblemagnon was born in France, the son of former Togolese goalkeeper Guy Agblemagnon. He debuted for the Togo national team in a friendly 0–0 tie with Libya on 24 March 2017.

References

External links
 
 
 
 Le Havre Profile
 Football365 Profile

1999 births
Living people
People from Vierzon
Sportspeople from Cher (department)
French sportspeople of Togolese descent
Citizens of Togo through descent
Togolese footballers
French footballers
Association football goalkeepers
Togo international footballers
Divisiones Regionales de Fútbol players
Le Havre AC players
SD Ponferradina B players
Footballers from Centre-Val de Loire
French expatriate footballers
Togolese expatriate footballers
French expatriate sportspeople in Portugal
French expatriate sportspeople in Spain
Togolese expatriate sportspeople in Portugal
Togolese expatriate sportspeople in Spain
Expatriate footballers in Portugal
Expatriate footballers in Spain